Leya may refer to:
 Grupo Leya, a Portuguese publishing company
 Leya language, a language of Zambia and Zimbabwe
 Ella Leya, Azerbaijani American composer, singer, and writer
 Leya Buchanan (born 1996), Canadian athlete
 Leya Evelyn, Canadian artist

See also 
 Prémio Leya, a Portuguese literary award
 Leia (disambiguation)
 Laya (disambiguation)
 Lea (disambiguation)
 Leya (disambiguation)